Styloptygma lacteolum is a species of sea snail, a marine gastropod mollusk in the family Pyramidellidae, the pyrams and their allies.

Distribution
This marine species occurs off Sri Lanka and Hawaii.

References

 Odé, H. (1998). Indo-Pacific taxa of turbonilids, excluding those along the Americas. Texas Conchologist. 34 (2): 33-103

External links
 To World Register of Marine Species

Pyramidellidae
Gastropods described in 1903